Bandit Ranger is a 1942 Western film.

It was the first of six Westerns produced starring Tim Holt between 11 May and 17 July 1942 caused by Holt's impending induction into the United States Army Air Forces.

Plot summary

Cast
 Tim Holt as Clay Travers
 Cliff Edwards as Ike (as Cliff 'Ukulele Ike' Edwards)
 Joan Barclay as Sally Mattison
 Kenneth Harlan as Mark Kenyon
 LeRoy Mason as Ed Martin (as Leroy Mason)
 Glenn Strange as Frank Curtis
 Jack Rockwell as Joe - Stage Driver
 Frank Ellis as Henchman
 Bob Kortman as Henchman
 Bud Geary as Henchman
 Dennis Moore as Frank Mattison
 Russell Wade as Tex - Clay's Ranchhand

References

External list
 
 
 
 

1942 films
American Western (genre) films
1942 Western (genre) films
RKO Pictures films
Films produced by Bert Gilroy
Films directed by Lesley Selander
American black-and-white films
1940s English-language films
1940s American films